The English rock band the Smiths recorded 74 songs during their five-year career, which included 70 originals and 4 covers. The band was formed in Manchester in 1982 and signed a one-off recording contract with independent record label Rough Trade Records, releasing their debut single, "Hand in Glove" in May 1983. The single found success in the UK, earning the group a full contract. Their follow-up singles, "This Charming Man" and "What Difference Does It Make?" fared better on the UK charts and helped increase the band's popularity. The next year saw the release of their self-titled debut album, several non-album singles, and Hatful of Hollow, a collection of B-sides, live recordings, and numerous non-album singles. The band's popularity increased with Meat Is Murder (1985), their only UK number one album, and The Queen Is Dead (1986), which reached number two on the UK charts and peaked in the US Top 100. Several non-album singles after Hatful of Hollow saw release on the compilations The World Won't Listen and Louder Than Bombs in early 1987. Despite their chart success, tensions began growing in the band, mainly between Marr and Morrissey and the band's label; the band announced their break-up shortly before the release of their final album, Strangeways, Here We Come. The live album Rank followed in 1988.

The majority of the Smiths' songs were written by the songwriting partnership of Morrissey and Johnny Marr. Throughout their career, their songs differed from the traditional synth-pop British sound of the early 1980s, instead fusing together 1960s rock and post-punk.
In their early years, the band purposely rejected synthesisers and dance music, until Meat Is Murder, which contained keyboards as well as rockabilly and funk influences. The Queen Is Dead was notable for featuring harder-rocking songs with witty, satirical lyrics of British social mores, intellectualism and class. Throughout their career, Morrissey drew attention during interviews and live performances for his provocative statements, such as criticising the Thatcher administration and being pro-vegetarian, as shown in the title track of Meat Is Murder. The Smiths often addressed controversial topics in their lyrics, including homosexuality ("Hand in Glove"), the Moors murders ("Suffer Little Children"), as well as burning "the disco" and hanging "the DJ" ("Panic"). Since their breakup, the Smiths have been considered one of the most influential bands of the 1980s, with Ian Youngs of BBC News describing them as "the band that inspired deeper devotion than any British group since the Beatles."

Songs

Notes

References

External links
The Smiths BMI Repertoire
The Smiths ASCAP Repertoire

 
Smiths, The
Smiths